Eugene Harrison Roche (September 22, 1928 – July 28, 2004) was an American actor and the original "Ajax Man" in 1970s television commercials.

Personal life
Roche was born and raised in Boston, Massachusetts, the son of Mary M. (née Finnegan) and Robert F. Roche, who was at the time serving in the U.S. Navy. He served in the U.S. Army after graduating from high school.

He married Marjory Perkins in 1953. The couple had nine children, including actor Eamonn Roche and Emmy Award-winning writer/producer Sean Roche. They divorced in 1981. Eugene Roche remarried in 1982 and remained married to his second wife, Anntoni C. Roche (née Bratman), until his death in 2004.

Career
After playing theater on various stages since 1953, Roche made his Broadway debut in 1961 as a bit player in the play Blood, Sweat and Stanley Poole with Darren McGavin and went on to appear in Mother Courage with Anne Bancroft in 1963, and in The White House with Helen Hayes in 1964. Television comedy became his forte with recurring roles on Soap, as Christine Sullivan's father on Night Court, Webster, and Larry Appleton's abusive boss on Perfect Strangers. Roche appeared as Pinky Peterson, one of Archie Bunker's buddies, on several episodes of All in the Family, in mostly comedic episodes. After a memorable performance as a prisoner of war who meets a shocking and sudden end in the film Slaughterhouse Five (1972), he had supporting parts in such feature films as The Late Show (1977), Foul Play (1978), and Corvette Summer (1978).

Roche played dramatic supporting roles as well, often playing deceptively ordinary men who are shown to be capable of ruthlessness, menacing violence or disturbing perversity. In Murder, She Wrote, he played a bad cop who attempts to kill Jessica Fletcher, and as a criminal mastermind posing as a Catholic bishop in the film Foul Play. He appeared in two episodes of Kojak. In 1977, he appeared in "Never Con a Killer" (the pilot episode for The Feather and Father Gang). He played alien Jor Brel in an episode of Star Trek: Voyager titled "Remember".

He made two appearances on Airwolf (once as United States Senator William Dietz in the pilot episode "Shadow of the Hawke", and again as Eddie in the episode "Firestorm" in season 2). Roche appeared in five episodes of Magnum, P.I. as Luther Gillis, an old style private eye. He is remembered for his recurring role as the Ajax Dishwasher in a series of television commercials and print advertisements.

Death
Roche died on July 28, 2004, aged 75, at a hospital in Encino, California, from a heart attack.

Selected filmography

 Splendor in the Grass (1961) .... Private Detective (uncredited)
 The Happening (1967) .... First Motorcycle Officer
 Cotton Comes to Harlem (1970) .... Lt. Anderson
 They Might Be Giants (1971) .... Policeman
 Crawlspace (1972, TV Movie) .... Sheriff Emil Birge
 Ironside (1972, TV Series) .... Marty, law school janitor
 Slaughterhouse-Five (1972) .... Edgar Derby
 Egan (1973) ... Detective Eddie Egan
 Newman's Law (1974) .... Reardon
 W (1974) .... Charles Jasper
 Mr. Ricco (1975) .... Detective George Cronyn
 Kojak (1975, TV series) .... Patrolman Lyle 'Sandy' Beach / Seymore Haywood
 The Streets of San Francisco (1976, TV Series) .... Charlie Springer
 All in the Family (1976–1978, TV Series) .... Pinky Petersen
 The Late Show (1977) .... Ronnie Birdwell
 Quinn Martin's Tales of the Unexpected (1977, TV Series) .... Major Jim Langston
 Soap (1977–1981, TV Series) .... E. Ronald Mallu, Esq.
 The Ghost of Flight 401 (1978, TV Movie) .... Andrews
 Corvette Summer (1978) .... Ed McGrath
 Foul Play (1978) .... Archbishop Thorncrest
 The New Maverick (1978, TV Movie) .... Judge Austin Crupper, President 1st National Bank of Deming Texas
 Good Time Harry (1980, TV Series) .... Jimmy Hughes
 Rape and Marriage: The Rideout Case (1980, TV Movie) .... Gary Gortmaker
 Miracle on Ice (1981, TV Movie) .... Don Craig
 Taxi (1982, TV Series) .... Jack
 Magnum, P.I. (1983-1988, TV Series) .... Luther Gillis
 Off Sides (Pigs vs. Freaks) (1984, TV Movie) .... Chief Frank Brockmeyer
 Webster (1984–1986, TV Series) .... Bill Parker
 Airwolf (1984, TV Series) .... Eddie Donahough / Senator William Dietz
 Oh, God! You Devil (1984) .... Charlie Gray
 Night Court (1984–1988, TV Series) .... Jack Sullivan
 Hardcastle and McCormick (1985, TV Series) .... Joseph Allen Murphy
 Stranded (1986, TV Movie) .... Sullivan 
 Highway To Heaven (1986, TV Series) .... Clancy
 Take Five (1987, TV Series) .... Max Davis
 Perfect Strangers (1987–1988, TV Series) .... Harry Burns
 Eternity (1990) .... Ridley / Governor
 Lenny (1990, TV Series) .... Pat
 The Last Halloween (1991, TV Short) .... Grandpa
 Julie (1992, TV Series) .... I.F. 'Wooley' Woolstein
 Batman: The Animated Series (1992-1993, TV Series) .... Arnold Stromwell
 When a Man Loves a Woman (1994) .... Walter
 Roswell (1994, TV Movie) .... James Forrestal
 A Friend to Die For (1994, TV Movie) .... Priest
 Executive Decision (1996) .... Admiral Lewis
 Honey, I Shrunk the Kids (1997, TV Series) .... Grandpa Matthew Murdock
 The Woman Chaser (1999) .... Used Car Dealer
 Dancing at the Harvest Moon (2002, TV Movie) .... Gil Finnigan

References

Further reading
 Vallance, Tom. Eugene Roche obituary, The Independent (August 8, 2004)
 Oliver, Myrna. "Eugene Roche, 75; Character Actor in Films, Television", Los Angeles Times, August 2, 2004; accessed August 27, 2015.

External links
 
 

 Eugene Roche at Aveleyman.com

1928 births
2004 deaths
American male film actors
American male stage actors
American male television actors
American male voice actors
Male actors from Boston
Emerson College alumni
20th-century American male actors
21st-century American male actors

it:Eugène Rouché